"Island of Stability" is a phrase that became the namesake for a 1977 speech by American president Jimmy Carter, while he was being hosted by Mohammad Reza Pahlavi at the Niavaran Complex in the city of Tehran, Iran. It was a reflection of Iran's circumstances — regarded as a stable country and a bastion of the Western Bloc in what was otherwise an unstable Middle East under the influence of the Eastern Bloc — and the importance placed on Pahlavi's rule by the United States. Carter's speech was made one year before the Islamic Revolution, in which Pahlavi's monarchical state was overthrown and replaced by the Islamic Republic.

Place and date
In late December 1977, Carter visited Pahlavi in Iran. At a party for New Year's Eve, held in Tehran's Niavaran Complex, he made a speech describing the American stance on Iran's place in the world order, stating: "Iran is an island of stability in one of the most troubled areas of the world"; he also described Pahlavi as a popular king among the Iranian people.

Consequences
After Carter's speech, Pahlavi felt encouraged further suppress his political opponents. One week later, in January 1978, the article "Iran and Red and Black Colonization" was published in Ettela'at under a pseudonym, targeting Ruhollah Khomeini. Following the article's publication, several protests occurred in Mashhad, Qom, and Tehran. Khomeini condemned Carter and described Pahlavi as a tyrant and a traitor to the Iranian nation.

Analysis of the support
Iranian journalist Ahmad Zeidabadi claimed that Carter was aware of the regional instability spurred by sporadic protests against Pahlavi's rule in Iran, and so he made the speech for Pahlavi as a reassurance of American support. Iranian academic Sadegh Zibakalam has stated that the speech was based on Carter's false impression of Iran's circumstances, and that the American government misjudged the true scope of the Islamic Revolution.

See also

 Jimmy Carter's engagement with Ruhollah Khomeini

References

External links
 Corpus of Political Speeches, publicly accessible with speeches from United States, Hong Kong, Taiwan, and China, provided by Hong Kong Baptist University Library

1977 speeches
1977 in Iran
Iran–United States relations
Iranian Revolution
Presidency of Jimmy Carter
Speeches by Jimmy Carter